New Horizon is the fourth studio album by Northern Ireland rock band The Answer. The album, which was released on 30 September 2013, was produced by Little Angels frontman Toby Jepson and features artwork from the legendary designer Storm Thorgerson, who was working on the cover shortly before his death in April 2013. New Horizon is the band's first album with Napalm Records, with whom they signed the previous year.

"Spectacular" is the first single taken from the album. It was released on 5 August 2013, on two formats: download, and a limited edition green and blue 7" vinyl.

Track listing
All tracks written by James Heatley, Paul Mahon, Cormac Neeson and Micky Waters, except where noted.

Source: Amazon.co.uk

Personnel
The Answer
 Cormac Neeson — lead vocals
 Paul Mahon — guitars
 Micky Waters — bass
 James Heatley — drums

Production
 Toby Jepson — production
 Ewan Davies — engineering
 Mike Fraser — mixing
 The Answer — 
 Guillermo "Will" Maya — 
 Shawn Joseph — mastering

Other
 Storm Thorgerson/Stormstudios — artwork design and photography
 Carrie Davenport — additional photography

Source:

References

2013 albums
The Answer (band) albums
Napalm Records albums
Albums with cover art by Storm Thorgerson